A Living Legend is the fifth album by Mother Maybelle Carter.

Track listing

References

1965 albums
Carter Family albums
Columbia Records albums